Vårt Land (which literally means "Our Country" in Norwegian) is a daily newspaper published in Oslo.  It has a nationwide target audience.  Its average daily circulation in 2007 was 27,146, making it Norway's 23rd largest newspaper.

History and profile
The founding meeting for Vårt Land was summoned on 28 September 1944, but the first edition was not published until 31 August 1945, with Bjarne Høye as the general editor and John Nome responsible for "spiritual and church-related matters."  The newspaper was initially published as a section in Morgenbladet, was subsequently issued as a standalone broadsheet paper, and in 1968 went to a tabloid format. It is owned by Mentor Medier (former Mediehuset Vårt Land), which also owns several related media properties. Vårt Land includes editorial material written in both Bokmål and Nynorsk. The offices of the newspaper have moved many times. In 1983 the newspaper moved its offices to Tveita in Oslo and it was one of the first Norwegian newspapers to use digital technology daily. It is now based in downtown Oslo.

The acting chief editor is Alf Gjøsund. Vårt Land has been published on the internet since 1996. Today, Vårt Land is not only a newspaper, but a part of a media house called Mentor Medier (former Mediehuset Vårt Land).

Vårt Land is an opinion paper. It has a conservative Christian stance in religious matters and a social-liberal leaning in political matters.

The newspaper is dependent on economic support from the Norwegian Government.

Circulation

Circulation grew through the years and peaked at about 30,000 in the beginning of the 1950s.  It sank to 18,500 in 1972.  It has grown modestly since then, but has recently seen some decrease. The newspaper is determined to invest in future growth.

Numbers from the Norwegian Media Businesses' Association, Mediebedriftenes Landsforening.

 1980: 24204
 1981: 24391
 1982: 25554
 1983: 26130
 1984: 24986
 1985: 26132
 1986: 27957
 1987: 28011
 1988: 27370
 1989: 27455
 1990: 27014
 1991: 27050
 1992: 27232
 1993: 29095
 1994: 30219
 1995: 30056
 1996: 30005
 1997: 30292
 1998: 30085
 1999: 29373
 2000: 29578
 2001: 29131
 2002: 27770
 2003: 26782
 2004: 27880
 2005: 29158
 2006: 27422
 2007: 27146
 2008: 26344
 2009: 25557
 2010: 24781
 2011: 24448
 2012: 24471
 2013: 23682
 2014: 22630
 2015: 22886
 2016: 22864
 2017: 21503

References

External links
 Vårt Land website

Newspapers published in Oslo
Christian media
Christian newspapers published in Norway
Newspapers established in 1945
1945 establishments in Norway
Daily newspapers published in Norway